Hutchison Whampoa Limited (HWL) was an investment holding company based in Hong Kong. It was a Fortune Global 500 company and one of the largest companies listed on the Hong Kong Stock Exchange. HWL was an international corporation with a diverse array of holdings which included the world's biggest port, and telecommunication operations in 14 countries that were run under the 3 brand. Its businesses also included retail, property development and infrastructure. 

It was 49.97% owned by the Cheung Kong Group until 3 June 2015, when the company merged with the Cheung Kong Group as part of a major reorganisation of the group's businesses. The combined business was renamed CK Hutchison Holdings Limited.

History
Hutchison Whampoa originated as two separate companies, both founded in the 19th century.   and Hutchison International was formed in 1877.

In the 1960s, Hutchison International – under Colonel Sir Douglas Clague (1917–1981) – gained a controlling interest of Hong Kong and Whampoa Dock, and in 1977 Hutchison acquired all of that company, creating Hutchison Whampoa Limited.

Although Hutchison Whampoa had a large portfolio of valuable real estate interests, in docks and retail ventures, the company eventually ran into trouble.  It was rescued by The Hongkong and Shanghai Banking Corporation, with HSBC taking a 22% stake in the company and ensuring that Clague was replaced.

On 25 September 1979, at the close of trade in London, HSBC announced that it was selling its stake in Hutchison Whampoa to Cheung Kong for HK$639 million.

In March 2011, Hutchison Port Holdings Trust (HPHT) announced that the company would IPO through Singapore Exchange for about US$5.4 billion. This would be the largest offering in South East Asia and surpass Petronas Chemicals' offering of about $4.1 billion.

In January 2015, Li Ka-shing entered into talks with Telefónica to buy its British mobile division O2 for around $15.4 billion but the deal was blocked in 2016 by the EU's Competition Commissioner.

In January 2015, Li Ka Shing confirmed plans for Cheung Kong Holdings to purchase the remaining shares in Hutchison Whampoa that it did not already own, and merge the two companies as CK Hutchison Holdings. The merger is part of a larger reorganisation of Li's businesses, which will involve the spin-off of property assets into Cheung Kong Property. The new holding company has been incorporated in the Cayman Islands, rather than Hong Kong.

In May 2015, Hutchison revealed plans to sell one-third of its stake in its British-based mobile phone businesses for a potential fee of $4.3 billion to five investors including GIC Private Limited, Canada Pension Plan Investment Board, Abu Dhabi Investment Authority, BTG Pactual and Caisse de dépôt et placement du Québec.

Operations
HWL operated in 54 countries and employed around 230,000 staff worldwide. The company had six core businesses, most of which transferred to CK Hutchison:

Ports and related services
Hutchison Port Holdings (HPH) operates across Europe, the Americas, Asia, the Middle East and Africa.  It operates in five of the seven busiest container ports in the world, handling 13% of the world's container traffic. Hutchison Whampoa operates container terminals in Panama, as well as Mexico and other parts of the Americas.

Property and hotels
From office buildings in Hong Kong, Beijing, Shanghai, to luxury residential properties in the United Kingdom, Hutchison Whampoa Property develops and invests in real estate. Together with Cheung Kong Holdings, HWL has set up a joint-venture company, Harbour Plaza Hotel Management to operate and manage hotels under the portfolio of the Hutchison Property division.

Retail
A.S. Watson Group (ASW), HWL's retail arm, operates its flagship retail chains in Asia such as  Watsons, ParknShop supermarket, TASTE food galleria, GOURMET boutique style fine food hall, GREAT Food Hall, Fortress electrical appliances store, Watson's Wine Cellar and Nuance-Watson duty-free operator. In Europe, ASW's retail network comprises health and beauty chains: DC, Drogas, Kruidvat, Rossmann, Savers Health & Beauty, Superdrug, Trekpleister, Spektr and Watson's, as well as luxury perfumeries and cosmetics retail brands: Marionnaud, ICI Paris XL and The Perfume Shop. A.S. Watson is the world's largest health and beauty retailer.

Infrastructure
Cheung Kong Infrastructure (CKI), HWL's infrastructure arm, is a diversified infrastructure company with businesses in transportation, energy, infrastructure materials, water plants and related operations.

Energy
HWL was a major shareholder of Husky Energy, one of Canada's largest energy and energy related companies, holding 33.97%.

Telecommunications
HWL owned the "3" brand. It also owns 60.4% of Hutchison Asia Telecommunications (HAT), which provides mobile phone networks and data services in Asia. The company's subsidiary 3 Group Europe owns its '3' branded businesses in Europe. Another 1% of HAT is owned directly by Cheung Kong Holdings, the holding behind Cheung Kong group to which HWL belongs.  Additionally, HWL is an official backer of the .mobi top level domain created specifically for the mobile internet and has launched the mobile portal Three.mobi under its "3" brand.  Hutchison Whampoa attempted to purchase O2 for £10.25 billion in March 2015, but the European Commission blocked the acquisition in May 2016.

Criticisms
Hutchison Whampoa has received criticism from charities such as the Burma Campaign UK and appear on the charity's 'dirty list' for their involvement in trade with the military junta in Burma.  They state that the company's subsidiary Myanmar International Terminals Thilawa (MITT) is "strategically positioned to facilitate and service Myanmar's international trade" and are concerned about the role foreign investment plays in "perpetuating" the country's brutal regime.

See also

 Jardine Matheson Group
 List of charities in the People's Republic of China
 List of companies in Hong Kong
 List of trading companies
 Swire Group

References

External links

Hutchison Whampoa 
Hutchison Whampoa Limited Company Profile Yahoo! Finance

Financial services companies established in 1863
1863 establishments in Hong Kong
2015 mergers and acquisitions
Predecessors of CK Hutchison Holdings
Companies formerly listed on the Hong Kong Stock Exchange
Conglomerate companies of China
Mobile phone companies of Hong Kong
Port operating companies
Multinational companies headquartered in Hong Kong
Trading companies of Hong Kong
Former companies in the Hang Seng Index
Retail companies of China
Conglomerate companies of Hong Kong